Romário Vieira da Silva (born 9 November 1990 in Alagoas, Brazil) is a Brazilian professional footballer who plays for Coras F.C. of Ascenso MX.

External links
 

Living people
1990 births
Brazilian footballers
Brazilian expatriate footballers
Association football midfielders
Associação Desportiva São Caetano players
Esporte Clube Santo André players
Oeste Futebol Clube players
Ituano FC players
Grêmio Esportivo Anápolis players
Rio Branco Esporte Clube managers
Associação Desportiva Recreativa e Cultural Icasa players
Marília Atlético Clube players
Coras de Nayarit F.C. footballers
Clube Atlético Patrocinense players
Guarany Sporting Club players
Associação Atlética Caldense players
Campeonato Brasileiro Série B players
Campeonato Brasileiro Série D players
Ascenso MX players
Expatriate footballers in Mexico
Brazilian expatriate sportspeople in Mexico
Brazilian football managers
Sportspeople from Alagoas